Star Wars: Galaxy's Edge is a themed area inspired by the Star Wars franchise, located in Disneyland Park at the Disneyland Resort in Anaheim, California, and Disney's Hollywood Studios at the Walt Disney World Resort in Orlando, Florida. It encompasses  at each park, and is set in the village of Black Spire Outpost, on the remote frontier planet of Batuu, featuring attractions, shops, restaurants and entertainment.

The lands were announced on August 15, 2015, and construction at both parks began on April 14, 2016. The Disneyland version opened May 31, 2019, and Disney's Hollywood Studios' version opened August 29, 2019. Walt Disney Imagineering executive Scott Trowbridge supervised development and construction at both parks.

History
Walt Disney Imagineering (WDI) initially developed plans in the early 2010s for a Star Wars-themed land at Disney's Hollywood Studios. Based on characters and settings from the original trilogy of Star Wars films, including Tatooine and Endor, the area would have encompassed the park's Echo Lake area, replacing the Indiana Jones Stunt Spectacular and Sounds Dangerous attractions and incorporating the existing Star Tours – The Adventures Continue. However in 2014, after consultation with Lucasfilm president Kathleen Kennedy, The Walt Disney Company CEO and chairman Bob Iger cancelled all of WDI's development on Star Wars-themed projects, postponing any creative development until   the release of the sequel trilogy and anthology films.

After a creative shift in design, a Star Wars-themed land was first publicly announced by Iger for both Disney's Hollywood Studios and Disneyland at the D23 Expo on August 15, 2015. According to Iger, the unnamed land would be "occupied by many inhabitants; humanoids, aliens and droids … the attractions, the entertainment, everything we create will be part of our storytelling. Nothing will be out of character or stray from the mythology." Bob Chapek, chairman of Walt Disney Parks and Resorts, stated that the land "will introduce you to a Star Wars planet you've never seen before — a gateway planet located on the outer rim, full of places and characters familiar and not so familiar."
In an interview for the winter 2015 issue of the official Disney fan club publication Disney twenty-three, Trowbridge stated: "[O]ur intent is to make it feel as if you just walked into one of the movies... Bringing Star Wars to life in the physical world gives us the opportunity to play with a whole bunch of things we've never done before... to really engage all of the senses. What does that street feel like? What does that animal smell like? What does blue milk taste like?"Iger announced in March 2016 that construction on both versions of the land would begin in April 2016. Construction began at both locations on April 14, 2016. In February 2017, Iger stated that the lands are scheduled to open in 2019 at both Disneyland and Hollywood Studios. In July 2017, at the D23 Expo, Chapek revealed that the themed lands would be called Star Wars: Galaxy's Edge. Chapek also announced that the Disneyland version would open first.

In November 2017, Trowbridge announced that the planet portrayed by the land is called Batuu, which appears in the 2018 novel Star Wars: Thrawn: Alliances.

In May 2018, Trowbridge revealed the village in which the land is set would be called Black Spire Outpost, a location briefly mentioned in the 2018 film Solo: A Star Wars Story. It was also announced that the Disneyland version of the land would open in summer 2019, followed by the Disney's Hollywood Studios version in late fall 2019. The names of the two new attractions at each location were announced in November 2018, during the D23 Destination D event held at Walt Disney World. A five-issue comic miniseries by Marvel Comics introduced the area's location in April 2019. Iger announced the opening dates for both locations on March 7, 2019.

The Disneyland version was dedicated on May 29, 2019. In attendance at the dedication ceremony were Iger, Star Wars creator George Lucas, and series actors Mark Hamill, Harrison Ford, and Billy Dee Williams. The Disneyland version opened to the public on May 31, and because of its high popularity, a virtual queuing system was implemented on June 24. The land at Disney's Hollywood Studios opened on August 29, 2019.

Design
Walt Disney Imagineering (WDI) designed the project in collaboration with the Lucasfilm Story Group, with Imagineer Scott Trowbridge supervising the project, Asa Kalama and Chris Beatty serving as executive creative directors,Bryshere Casiano as the structural engineer, and Lucasfilm's Pablo Hidalgo and designer Doug Chiang of Industrial Light & Magic (ILM) involved as consultants. Together, the team decided to set the lands on a new planet, located within the Outer Rim of the Unknown Regions. Described as a "remote frontier outpost", the planet Batuu has not previously appeared in other media, although it has existed within canon "for thousands and thousands of years." The team chose to create a newly designed world instead of using an existing planet from the films, such as Tatooine or Hoth, because those locations evoked a pre-existing familiarity with guests, with Trowbridge explaining, "We wanted to build new Star Wars stories, new Star Wars destinations." He says of the new planet,

The development team drew inspiration from real-world locations, including Istanbul, Morocco, Jerusalem and Egypt and traveled there to study the architecture, culture, and weather. The team also cited Ralph McQuarrie's concept art for the original Star Wars trilogy as a basis for the architecture and aesthetic look of the land. The landscape of Galaxy's Edge features -tall spires standing amongst the rockwork that are intended to be the petrified remains of massive trees of an ancient forest; Imagineers based this landscape from the Petrified Forest National Park in Arizona. WDI used in-house virtual reality programs to realize where to use forced perspective and place thematic details in relation to sightlines to hide the park's show buildings from guest view. Disney consciously modified traditional theme park attributes throughout the lands—such as having signs written in the fictional Aurebesh language rather than English, and omitting attraction marquees and Star Wars-branded merchandise—as a way of maintaining the natural theming of the land. Being located in California and Florida, both iterations of Galaxy's Edge are situated at different latitudes and also face in separate cardinal directions; Disneyland has an east-west orientation and Disney's Hollywood Studios has a north-south orientation. This contrast in layout means both locations receive different amounts of sunlight at various angles throughout the seasonal year. As a result, both locations were designed with distinct shades of paint and color palettes in mind.

The story events are set between the films Episode VIII – The Last Jedi and Episode IX – The Rise of Skywalker, and depicts the presence of both the First Order and Resistance. At the time of their openings, both locations of Star Wars: Galaxy's Edge had one attraction: Millennium Falcon: Smugglers Run, which allows riders to control the Falcon during a "customized secret mission". This would be followed by Star Wars: Rise of the Resistance, that places guests into the middle of a battle between the First Order and the Resistance. Concept art depicted a full-size Millennium Falcon situated among alien buildings built into tall cliffs. Rise of the Resistance is a 28 minute long experience with more than 300 animated objects; housed within one of the largest show buildings Disney has ever built for a dark ride. Film actors Daisy Ridley, Oscar Isaac, John Boyega, Adam Driver, Domhnall Gleeson, and Kipsang Rotich reprised their roles in the attraction as Rey, Poe Dameron, Finn, Kylo Ren, General Hux, and the voice of Nien Nunb, respectively. Frank Oz also reprised the role as the voice of Yoda, for the character's vocal appearance in Savi's Workshop.

In addition, the area features Oga's Cantina, which is the first location in Disneyland Park to sell alcoholic drinks to the public. Riders' performances on the Millennium Falcon influence how they are treated at the cantina, adding to the immersive experience. According to the Disney Parks Blog, "perform with skill and you may earn extra galactic credits, while bringing the ship back banged up could put you on the list of a bounty hunter. End up on Harkos' list and you may face a problem if you show up at the local cantina." The cantina's music is provided by R-3X, a droid that was first seen as RX-24 (a.k.a. Captain Rex) in Star Tours, and is now the cantina's DJ. Paul Reubens returned to voice the character.

The Black Spire Outpost marketplace contains a toy stall run by a Toydarian, an alien species that was seen on Tatooine in Episode I – The Phantom Menace. There is also a creature stall. A TIE Echelon, where Kylo Ren makes his daily appearance, was developed by Colin Trevorrow during his work on Episode IX before being replaced as the film's director.

Music 
Longtime Star Wars composer John Williams returned to compose the main musical theme for Galaxy's Edge. Williams' theme is interpolated and arranged diversely throughout the land as ambient music, instead of in its traditional symphonic format. William Ross, who conducted the symphonic recording of the theme with the London Symphony Orchestra (LSO) on Williams' behalf, was also responsible for arranging Williams' original composition in different musical contexts for use. Ross and the LSO recorded nearly an hour of musical material at Abbey Road Studios in November 2018. The musical score for Smugglers Run and Rise of the Resistance attractions feature reprisals of previous Star Wars themes written by Williams, adapted and conducted by Ross. A five-minute symphonic suite was released digitally by Walt Disney Records on May 3, 2019. The suite was first heard in its entirety at Star Wars Celebration Chicago in 2019. In addition to Williams's score, 29 original songs were commissioned to the music team for use as ambience as well. On September 6, 2019, Star Wars: Galaxy's Edge Oga's Cantina: R-3X's Playlist #1 was released by Walt Disney Records, featuring eighteen tracks heard at Oga's Cantina inside Galaxy's Edge. Music from Star Wars: Galaxy's Edge Oga's Cantina: R-3X's Playlist #1 was publicly played for the first time at Star Wars Celebration Chicago 2019.

Williams won the Grammy Award for Best Instrumental Composition for the Star Wars: Galaxy's Edge Symphonic Suite. The suite currently has over 313,000 views on YouTube.

Locations

Disneyland Park

At Disneyland Park, Galaxy's Edge is located in the northwest portion of the park, with three entries from Frontierland, Critter Country, and Fantasyland. As a result of the expansion, Disney closed Big Thunder Ranch and adjacent backstage areas, and purchased nearby properties to relocate the office and warehouse space that was on the land. 

One of the backstage areas thus closed was Circle D Ranch, a facility for training and exercising the park's horses.  To replace it, Disney purchased an existing ranch in Norco, California and renovated the facility into the new Circle D Ranch, which opened in June 2017.  Since then, the park's horses have commuted to Disneyland in special trailers in groups of four at a time.  Each group spends three or four days working in the park (and resting in a backstage barn), then the horses are driven back to the Norco ranch. 

The construction of Galaxy's Edge required a reconfigured route for the Disneyland Railroad and Rivers of America. A first look at how these changes would impact the park was revealed in January 2016, when concept art was released depicting the northern bank of the river after construction was completed. On January 11, 2016, several attractions in Frontierland and Critter Country were closed. Big Thunder Ranch closed permanently, including the multifunction event space, barbecue restaurant and petting zoo. Other attractions closed temporarily, including the Disneyland Railroad and Rivers of America. Tom Sawyer Island reopened on June 16, 2017, Fantasmic! reopened on July 17, and the Disneyland Railroad, Mark Twain Riverboat, Sailing Ship Columbia, and Davy Crockett Explorer Canoes all reopened on July 29. The land opened on May 31, 2019.

Disney's Hollywood Studios

At Disney's Hollywood Studios, Galaxy's Edge is located in the southwest portion of the park, with two entries from Grand Avenue and Toy Story Land. Galaxy's Edge replaced the majority of the park's former Streets of America area, including the Lights, Motors, Action! Extreme Stunt Show and Honey, I Shrunk the Kids: Movie Set Adventure attractions, which closed on April 2, 2016, as well as the surrounding New York-San Francisco backlot facades, restaurants, and shops. The remaining operating portion of Streets of America, containing Muppet*Vision 3D, and a surviving block of the New York facades, was rethemed as Grand Avenue, a Los Angeles-themed street. An earthen berm with a Figueroa Street themed-tunnel was constructed between Galaxy's Edge and Grand Avenue to divide and connect the two lands. The land opened on August 29, 2019. The land is accompanied by the Star Wars: Galactic Starcruiser themed hotel.

Attractions
 Star Wars: Millennium Falcon – Smugglers Run – a simulator ride in which guests pilot the Millennium Falcon.
 Star Wars: Rise of the Resistance – a dark ride in which guests are involved in a battle between the First Order and the Resistance. The attraction opened at Disney's Hollywood Studios on December 5, 2019, and at Disneyland Park on January 17, 2020.

Restaurants and shops
 Oga's Cantina – a restaurant to sample custom drinks and snacks.
 Docking Bay 7 Food and Cargo – a restaurant inside a  hangar bay
 Ronto Roasters – a stand for grilled sausage and roasted pork wraps.
 Kat Saka's Kettle – a stand for popcorn snack.
 Savi's Workshop – a shop for custom lightsabers
 Dok-Ondar's Den of Antiquities – a store for Jedi or Sith Holocrons, artifacts, and lightsabers
 Mubo's Droid Depot – a shop for custom droids
 Bina's Creature Stall – a shop with plush creatures and critters from around the galaxy
 Toydarian Toymaker – a workshop with handcrafted toys made by local artisans
 First Order Cargo – a shop with outfits aligned with the First Order
 Resistance Supply – a shop with outfits aligned against the First Order
 The Milk Stand – a stand for blue or green milk.
 Black Spire Outfitters – an apparel shop to dress like the citizens of Batuu

Reception
The Disneyland version was named one of Time magazine's "World's Greatest Places 2019". While the themed area initially drew crowds to the point of leaving the rest of Disneyland relatively empty, a drop in attendance after the first few months led to the resignation of Catherine Powell, who oversaw the U.S. themed areas. However, in October 2019, some visitors reported that Disney's Hollywood Studios area was crowded during their visit.

Other media
Music:
The land's theme music was composed by John Williams and then recorded by the London Symphony Orchestra at Abbey Road Studios conducted by William Ross. A 5-minute symphonic suite was released digitally by Walt Disney Records on May 3, 2019, which won a Grammy Award for Best Instrumental Composition.
Comic books:
Batuu's Black Spire Outpost is the focus of the five-issue mini-series Star Wars: Galaxy's Edge from Marvel Comics. It was written by Ethan Sacks with art by Will Sliney, and began in April 2019.
Prose books:
Star Wars: Galaxy's Edge: Black Spire or simply Black Spire (Del Rey, September 2019) by Delilah Dawson; General Leia Organa dispatches a spy to the planet Batuu looking for possible Resistance allies.
A Crash of Fate, a young-adult novel (Disney Lucasfilm Press) by Zoraida Cordova; childhood friends reunited as they are chased by the planet's smugglers.
Star Wars: Myths and Fables, a middle reader novel (Disney Lucasfilm Press) written by George Mann, with art by Grant Griffin; an anthology that includes two stories based on Batuu.
TV special:
A two-hour behind-the-scenes TV special, titled Star Wars: Galaxy's Edge – Adventure Awaits, premiered on September 29, 2019.
Virtual reality:

 Star Wars: Tales from the Galaxy's Edge, a virtual reality experience for Oculus platforms.

See also
 The Wizarding World of Harry Potter, a themed land at Universal Parks & Resorts in Universal Orlando, Universal Studios Japan in Osaka, Universal Studios Hollywood and Universal Studios Beijing.
 Pandora – The World of Avatar, a themed land at Disney's Animal Kingdom.
 Avengers Campus, themed lands at Disney California Adventure, Walt Disney Studios Park and Hong Kong Disneyland.

References

External links

Official Disneyland website
Official Disney's Hollywood Studios website

 
Themed areas in Walt Disney Parks and Resorts
Disneyland
Disney's Hollywood Studios
Walt Disney Studios Park
Galaxy's Edge
2019 establishments in California
2019 establishments in Florida
Star Wars Galaxy's Edge
2019 architecture